Gandi Sulistiyanto Soeherman (born February 13, 1960) is a businessperson, an Indonesian diplomat, and former Managing Director of Sinar Mas Group. He serves as the Indonesia Ambassador to South Korea.

Personal life 
Sulistiyanto was born in Pekalongan, Central Java. He is the eldest of six children from a farming family. He received an undergraduate degree from Diponegoro University, Semarang.

Under the care of his grandparents, Sulistiyanto went through high school and college while working and entrepreneurship in order to help pay for his younger siblings' education. His professional career began after studying at Diponegoro University – which also brought him together with Susi Ardhani, his life partner.

Career 
The first ten years of his career took place at an automotive company, which is now known as Astra International, then continued to Sinar Mas by joining one of its companies, PT Asuransi Jiwa Eka Life (now known as Sinar Mas MSIG Life) in 1992.

Having experienced various assignments and positions in a number of Sinar Mas business pillars, in 2001 he was trusted to become the Managing Director of Sinar Mas, with the initial challenge of leading the Sinar Mas Debt Restructuring Task Force Team, which at that time amounted to USD13.5 billion, the impact of the Asian financial crisis in 1998.

He has served as Managing Director of Sinar Mas from 2001 to 2021.

Indonesian Ambassador to South Korea 
In June 2021, President Joko Widodo proposed Gandi Sulistiyanto as the sole candidate for Indonesia Ambassador to South Korea.

Sulis was sworn in as Ambassador to South Korea on November 17, 2021 at Istana Negara, and would assume his role in South Korea in December 2021.

See also 
 Asia Pulp & Paper
 Eka Tjipta Foundation
 Smartfren Telecom
 Berau Coal
 Bumi Serpong Damai
 Tjiwi Kimia
 Sinar Mas Multiartha

References 

Ambassadors of Indonesia to South Korea
1960 births
Living people
Sinar Mas Group